In mathematics, the Fibonomial coefficients or Fibonacci-binomial coefficients are defined as

where n and k are non-negative integers, 0 ≤ k ≤ n, Fj is the j-th Fibonacci number and n!F is the nth Fibonorial, i.e.

 

where 0!F, being the empty product, evaluates to 1.

Special values
The Fibonomial coefficients are all integers. Some special values are:

Fibonomial triangle
The Fibonomial coefficients  are similar to binomial coefficients and can be displayed in a triangle similar to Pascal's triangle. The first eight rows are shown below.

The recurrence relation

implies that the Fibonomial coefficients are always integers.

The fibonomial coefficients can be expressed in terms of the Gaussian binomial coefficients and the golden ratio :

Applications

Dov Jarden proved that the Fibonomials appear as coefficients of an equation involving powers of consecutive Fibonacci numbers, namely Jarden proved that given any generalized Fibonacci sequence , that is, a sequence that satisfies  for every  then

for every integer , and every nonnegative integer .

References

 
 Ewa Krot, An introduction to finite fibonomial calculus, Institute of Computer Science, Bia lystok University, Poland.
 
 Dov Jarden, Recurring Sequences (second edition 1966), pages 30–33.

Fibonacci numbers
Factorial and binomial topics
Triangles of numbers